Elephant's toothpaste  is a foamy substance caused by the rapid decomposition of hydrogen peroxide using potassium iodide (KI) or yeast and warm water as a catalyst. How rapidly the reaction proceeds will depend on the concentration of hydrogen peroxide.

Because it requires only a small number of ingredients and makes a "volcano of foam", this is a popular experiment for children to perform in school or at parties.

Explanation

Description 
About 50 ml of concentrated (>12%) hydrogen peroxide is first mixed with liquid soap or dishwashing detergent. Then, a catalyst, often around 10 ml potassium iodide solution or catalase from baker's yeast, is added to make the hydrogen peroxide decompose very quickly. Hydrogen peroxide breaks down into oxygen and water. As a small amount of hydrogen peroxide generates a large volume of oxygen, the oxygen quickly pushes out of the container. The soapy water traps the oxygen, creating bubbles, and turns into foam. About 5-10 drops of food coloring could also be added before the catalyst to dramatize the effect. How rapidly the reaction occurs will depend on the concentration of hydrogen peroxide used.

Chemical explanation 
This experiment shows the catalyzed decomposition of hydrogen peroxide. Hydrogen peroxide (H2O2) decomposes into water and oxygen gas, which is in the form of foam, but normally the reaction is too slow to be easily perceived or measured:
 2H2O2 -> 2H2O + O2 ^
In normal conditions, this reaction takes place very slowly, therefore a catalyst is added to speed up the reaction, which will result in rapid formation of foam. The iodide ion from potassium iodide acts as a catalyst and speeds up the reaction while remaining chemically unchanged in the reaction process. The iodide ion changes the mechanism by which the reaction occurs:
 
The reaction is exothermic; the foam produced is hot (about 75°C). A glowing splint can be used to show that the gas produced is oxygen.
The rate of foam formation measured in volume per time unit has a positive correlation with the peroxide concentration (v/V%), which means that the more reactants (peroxide concentration) the faster the rate of foam formation.

Variations 
YouTube science entertainer Mark Rober has created a variation of the experiment, named "Devil's Toothpaste", which has a far more pronounced reaction than the version usually performed in classroom settings. The ingredients to create the devils toothpaste reaction are the same as the regular elephants toothpaste reaction, the only difference being that 50% H202 instead of the usual 35%.

See also 
 Black snake (firework)
 Carbon snake
 Soda geyser

References

External links 

The Elephant's Toothpaste Experiment sciencebob.com

Chemistry classroom experiments
Articles containing video clips